Tenaniʻa Ariʻifaʻaite a Hiro (10 January 1820 – 6 August 1873) was a Prince consort of Tahiti. He was son of Ariʻipeu a Hiro and Teihotu alias Ta'avea daughter of Tamatoa IV of Raiatea.  He became second consort of his first cousin, Pōmare IV, Queen of Tahiti, who was likewise a maternal granddaughter of Tamatoa IV. He and his wife had issue:

 A boy (1833, died young), died of dysentery
 Henry Pōmare (August 1835, died young)., died of dysentery
 Ariʻiaue Pōmare (12 August 1838 – 10 May 1856), Crown Prince of Tahiti, Ariʻi of Afaʻahiti.
 Pōmare V (3 November 1839 – 12 June 1891), succeeded as King of Tahiti.
 Teriʻimaevarua II (23 May 1841 – 12 February 1873), succeeded as Queen of Bora Bora.
 Tamatoa V (23 September 1842 – 30 September 1881), succeeded as King of Raiatea.
 Victoria Pōmare-vahine (1844 – June 1845).
 Punuariʻi Teriʻitapunui Pōmare (20 March 1846 – 18 September 1888), Ariʻi of Mahina and President of the Tahitian High Court.
 Teriʻitua Tuavira Pōmare (17 December 1847 – 9 April 1875), Ariʻirahi of Hitiaʻa, called the "Prince of Joinville".
 Tevahitua Pōmare (1850/1852, died young).

References

Bibliography

Succession 

1820 births
1873 deaths
Pōmare dynasty